Li Chunxiu (Chinese: 李春秀; born August 13, 1969) is a Chinese race walker, who won the bronze medal over 10 km at the 1992 Summer Olympics in Barcelona.

She also won the 1993 East Asian Games and finished second at the Asian Championships the same year.

References

1969 births
Living people
Chinese female racewalkers
Athletes (track and field) at the 1992 Summer Olympics
Olympic athletes of China
Olympic bronze medalists for China
Medalists at the 1992 Summer Olympics
Olympic bronze medalists in athletics (track and field)
20th-century Chinese women